This is a season-by-season list of records compiled by Michigan Tech in men's ice hockey.

Michigan Technological University has won three NCAA Championship in its history, the most recent coming in 1975 (as of 2018).

Season-by-season results

Note: GP = Games played, W = Wins, L = Losses, T = Ties

* Winning percentage is used when conference schedules are unbalanced.† Tim Watters was fired in November of 2000 after a 1–7–1 start.

Footnotes

References

 
Lists of college men's ice hockey seasons in the United States
Michigan sports-related lists